Steetley Company Ground is a cricket ground in Shireoaks, Nottinghamshire, England.  The ground was laid out in 1951 and the first important match on the ground was in 1955, when the Nottinghamshire Second XI played  the Yorkshire Second XI.  The ground has played host to both Nottinghamshire Second XI and Derbyshire Second XI matches in the Second XI Championship and Second XI Trophy.

In 1961, the ground hosted a first-class match in the County Championship when Nottinghamshire played Sussex. Norman Hill of Nottinghamshire made 201 not out, then Alan Oakman of Sussex made 229 not out, and after two declarations Sussex won by nine wickets. The pitch and ground were excellent, but in the relatively remote location the gate takings were poor, and Nottinghamshire never played there again.

The ground held a single Women's One Day International in 1979 when England women played West Indies women.

References

External links
Steetley Company Ground on CricketArchive
Steetley Company Ground on Cricinfo

Cricket grounds in Nottinghamshire
Sports venues completed in 1951